The 1916 United States presidential election in Iowa took place on November 7, 1916, as part of the 1916 United States presidential election which was held throughout all contemporary 48 states. Voters chose 13 representatives, or electors to the Electoral College, who voted for president and vice president.

Iowa was won by Republican nominee, U.S. Supreme Court Justice Charles Evans Hughes of New York, and his running mate Senator Charles W. Fairbanks of Indiana. They defeated Democratic nominees, incumbent Democratic President Woodrow Wilson and Vice President Thomas R. Marshall.

Hughes won the state by a margin of 11.36%.

With 54.25% of the vote, Iowa would prove to be Hughes' fourth strongest state in terms of popular votes percentage after Vermont, New Jersey and Pennsylvania.

This election was won of only three elections in the state’s history that it voted against the winning incumbent as Woodrow Wilson was the first presidential incumbent to secure a second consecutive term in office without carrying the state until FDR in 1940 who lost it in his third and then fourth presidential victory in 1944. They are currently the only US Presidential to date to have carried the state upon winning the White House and lost it upon winning re-election.

Results

Results by county

See also
 United States presidential elections in Iowa

References

Iowa
1916
1916 Iowa elections